is a Japanese former football player.

Career
After four seasons with Kamatamare Sanuki, Nishi retired at the end of the 2019 season.

Club stats
Updated to 5 January 2020.

1Includes Relegation Playoffs to J3.

References

External links
Profile at Kamatamare Sanuki

1987 births
Living people
Ryutsu Keizai University alumni
Association football people from Kumamoto Prefecture
Japanese footballers
J1 League players
J2 League players
J3 League players
Roasso Kumamoto players
Oita Trinita players
Kamatamare Sanuki players
Association football defenders